Alberto Anderson (born 1900, date of death unknown) was an Argentine rower. He competed in the men's eight event at the 1924 Summer Olympics.

References

External links
 
 

1900 births
Year of death missing
Argentine male rowers
Olympic rowers of Argentina
Rowers at the 1924 Summer Olympics
Place of birth missing